Anthony Bianchi (born August 26, 1958) is a Japanese politician, who was an American citizen of Italian descent and became a naturalized Japanese citizen in 2002. He is a city councillor of Inuyama, Aichi, and the chairman of Inuyama City council from 2017 to 2019. He is the first naturalized Japanese served as a city council top in Japan.

Background 
Bianchi was born on August 26, 1958, in Brooklyn, New York. He graduated from Xaverian High School in June 1976. After graduating from New York University in June 1980, he became a member of Embassy Communications.

By the finale of the sitcom The Jeffersons, he left Embassy Communications. Then he worked in the government of New York City. In 1989, he went to Aichi Prefecture, Japan as an Assistant Language Teacher under the JET Program. From April 1996, he worked in the Municipal Board of Education of Inuyama, Aichi. He married a Japanese woman in 2000.

Political career 
Bianchi was naturalized in Japan in 2002. He joined in the election for city councilors of Inuyama, Aichi on April 27, 2003, where he was elected at the top of all candidates. After became the city councilor, he called for the disclosure of information by presenting the meetings of city council on television and putting minutes on the homepage of Inuyama, Aichi.

On September 5, 2006, the former mayor of Inuyama, Yoshihiro Ishida resigned after declaring he will join the election for the governor of Aichi Prefecture, Bianchi resigned the city councilor on October 19, by declaring he will join the election for mayor of Inuyama on December 17, but lost.

On May 11, 2017, Bianchi was elected as the chairman of City Council of Inuyama.

In February 2018, a new system called "Residents' Free Speech System" was introduced in Inuyama City Council by Bianchi, let every resident of Inuyama can come to the meeting of city council to leave comments or make questions. As this system was evaluated by citizens, City Council of Inuyama earned the "13th Manifesto Award" on November 9, 2018.

Book

References 

Living people
1958 births
People from Brooklyn
New York University alumni
Naturalized citizens of Japan
Japanese people of American descent
Japanese people of Italian descent
Japanese municipal councilors
Politicians from Aichi Prefecture